Terra is the fourth studio album by Portuguese fado singer Mariza, released on 30 June 2008.  At the Latin Grammy Awards, it was nominated for both Best Folk Album and Best Producer.  Contributions from Cape Verdean singer Tito Paris, Argentine guitarist Dominic Miller, and Spanish singer Concha Buika give Terra a jazz, African, and Latin influence.  Also included at the end of the album is a cover of Charlie Chaplin's famous ballad, "Smile".

Reception

Terra was the album of Mariza that more experimented with languages not close associated with fado.

Terra became Mariza's fourth album to feature on Billboard's World Albums chart, where it peaked at number 5 in March 2009.

Track listing

Personnel
 Vocals: Mariza, Concha Buika, Tito Paris
 Acoustic Guitar: Bernardo Couto, Diogo Clemente, Dominic Miller
 Flamenco Guitar: Javier Limón
 Recorder: Melissa Nanni
 Trumpet: Carlos Sarduy
 Piano: Ivan "Melon" Lewis, Chucho Miller
 Acoustic Bass: Marino De Freitas
 Double Bass: Dany Noel
 Percussion: Pirana

References

External links
 Mariza.com Mariza's Official Website

2008 albums
Mariza albums